Babeni is a town and union council of Mardan District in the Khyber Pakhtunkhwa province of Pakistan.

it is about 6–7 km away from the main city of mardan
on swabi road there is a way towards north-west that leads to babini
on the way to babeni there are many villages as ijara kalay, shaamelaat and many others.

References 

.

Union councils of Mardan District
Populated places in Mardan District